The 2011–12 UCLA Bruins men's basketball team represented the University of California, Los Angeles during the 2011–12 NCAA Division I men's basketball season.  The Bruins competed in the Pac-12 Conference and were led by head coach Ben Howland. The team ended the season with a 19–14 record and did not participate in the NCAA National Championship tournament or the NIT.

Recruiting class

Roster

Schedule

|-
!colspan=9 style=|Exhibition

|-
!colspan=9 style=|Regular Season

|-
!colspan=9 style=| Pac-12 Tournament 
|-

|-

Rankings

UCLA was ranked No. 20 in the preseason Coaches' Poll. They were also the media's preseason pick to win the Pac-12 conference title.

Notes
 March 27, 2011 – Tyler Honeycutt leaving UCLA to enter 2011 NBA Draft 
 March 27, 2011 – Former North Carolina Tarheels Point Guard Larry Drew II enrolls at UCLA
 April 13, 2011 – Malcolm Lee announced he would forgo his final year of college eligibility and hire an agent and enter the 2011 NBA draft.
 June 7, 2011 – Korey McCray was hired as a new assistant coach, replacing Scott Duncan.
 December 9, 2011 – Reeves Nelson was dismissed from the team after his second indefinite suspension for conduct issues. The 6-foot-9 junior forward led the Bruins in scoring (13.9) and rebounding (9.1) in 2010–11 when he was named All-Pac-10.
 March 5, 2012 – Guard Lazeric Jones was named Pac-12 Men's Basketball Player of the Week for Feb. 27 – March 4; Jones was named to the All-Pac-12 second team and David Wear received honorable mention.

References

External links

 UCLA Bruins men's basketball official website

UCLA
UCLA Bruins men's basketball seasons
UCLA Bruins men's bask
UCLA Bruins men's bask